Jack Moore may refer to:

Jack Moore (sportsman) (1911–?), English amateur footballer, referee and tennis player
Jack D. Moore (1906–1998), American set decorator
Jack Moore (basketball) (1959–1984), American college basketball player
Jack B. Moore, American chief executive
Jack Moore (preacher) (1905–1975), American deliverance preacher
Jack Moore, cartoonist, creator of Kelly & Duke
Clayton Moore (Jack Carlton Moore, 1914–1999), American actor best known for playing the Lone Ranger
Jack Moore (actor), see Green Arrow (Connor Hawke)

See also
John Moore (disambiguation)